Uthanur or Uttanur is a village located in Mulbagal Tehsil of Kolar district in the southern Indian state of Karnataka. It is located about 85 km east of the state capital, Bangalore. In 2011, its population was 1604 inhabitants, with 817 males and 787 females. In this village the Shri Varadaraja Swamy, the Chowdeshary, and the Uttameshwara temples are very famous.

Education
 Govt Higher primary school
 MV Krishnappa High School 
 Anjanadri D.Ed College 
 General and BCM Boys Hostels
 Sudhasri Vidydari Vidya Samsthe, Bandarahalli
 Jayaprakash Narayan High School, M.Agrahara

Divisions
Alaganahalli 
Banahalli 
Doddagurki 
K.G. Lakshmisagara 
Kenchanahalli 
Nagareddyhalli 
Nallandahalli 
Pombarahalli 
Shivanarahalli 
Uthanur 
Vaniganahalli 
Yanadigollahalli
Mallasandra
Maralamedu
Ramapura

Infrastructure
Uttanur is near by 6 km for  NH-4, a newly-laid four-lane road from Bangalore to Nangali Mulbagal Kolar district. Approximately 354 km of major roads connect other locations to this area.

References 

Villages in Kolar district